Darragh Coen (born 1975) is an Irish retired hurler who played as a right corner-forward for the Galway senior team.

Born in Clarinbridge, County Galway, Coen first played competitive hurling in his youth. He enjoyed championship success at under-age levels with the Clarinbridge club. Landers subsequently joined the Clarinbridge senior team and won one Connacht medal and one championship medal.

Coen made his début on the inter-county scene when he first linked up with the Galway minor team. An All-Ireland medal winner in this grade, he later lined out with the under-21 team with whom he also enjoyed All-Ireland success. Coen joined the senior team during the 1997 National Hurling League. He went on to play a key role for Galway as a forward and won two Connacht medals.

References

1975 births
Living people
Clarinbridge hurlers
Galway inter-county hurlers
Hurling forwards